Neeta Pateriya (born 3 November 1962) is a member of the 14th Lok Sabha of India. She represents the Seoni constituency of Madhya Pradesh and is a member of the Bharatiya Janata Party (BJP) political party.

External links
 Members of Fourteenth Lok Sabha - Parliament of India website

Living people
1962 births
Lok Sabha members from Madhya Pradesh
Bharatiya Janata Party politicians from Madhya Pradesh
People from Chhatarpur
People from Seoni, Madhya Pradesh
India MPs 2004–2009
Women in Madhya Pradesh politics
21st-century Indian women politicians
21st-century Indian politicians